Papita, maní, tostón is a 2013 Venezuelan comedy film written and directed by Luis Carlos Hueck. Starring Juliette Pardau and Jean Pierre Agostini, it narrates the encounter between two eternal baseball teams rivals, a fan of the Leones del Caracas and another of the Navegantes de Magallanes.

Plot
Andrés (Jean Pierre Agostini) is an inveterate fan of the  Leones del Caracas one of the main baseball teams of Venezuela. Julissa (Juliette Pardau) is a fan of Navegantes del Magallanes, the rival team. 

One day Andrés mistakenly gets tickets to see the match in the VIP area of Magallanes. There, he meets up with Julissa, who a huge fan of his rival team. Both fall in love but, to be together, they will have to pretend to be of the opposite team to the confusion and annoyance of their relatives and friends, causing the most amusing situations.

Cast
 Jean Pierre Agostini as Andrés
 Juliette Pardau as Julissa
 Miguel Ángel Landa as Abuelo
 Vicente Peña as Eduardo
 Vantroy Sánchez as Ricardo
 Juan Andres Belgrave as Felipe
 José Roberto Díaz as Vicente Gallanes
 Antonieta Colón as Tita
 Elias Muñoz as Camacho Magallanero
 Ana Karina Terrero as Chachi
 Amanda Key as Yesaidu
 Emilio Lovera as Hot Dog seller
 Ruggiero Orlando as Tato
 José Quijada as Augusto
 Mascioli Zapata as Samulo

Reception
The Venezuelan comedy became the highest grossing film in the history of Venezuelan cinema, after reaching 1,979,917  spectators. The news was released by the Centro Nacional Autónomo de Cinematografía (CNAC) through their Twitter account. Luis Carlos Hueck's debut overcame Venezuelan tapes Homicidio culposo, released in 1984, seen by 1,335,252 spectators and Macu, la mujer del policía, released in 1987, seen by 1,180,621 spectators.

References

External links
 

2013 films
Venezuelan comedy films
2010s Spanish-language films
Baseball films